The 2002–03 Washington Capitals season was the Washington Capitals 29th season in the National Hockey League (NHL).

Off-season
Head coach Ron Wilson was fired on May 10. The Capitals named Bruce Cassidy their new head coach on June 25. Steve Konowalchuk was named the team’s lone captain while Brendan Witt, who was co-captain of the team in 2001–02 with Konowalchuk, remained one of four alternate captains.

Regular season
The Capitals tied the Detroit Red Wings, Los Angeles Kings and New Jersey Devils for the fewest short-handed goals allowed, with just four.

On January 11, 2003, the Capitals defeated the Florida Panthers at home by a score of 12–2. Jaromir Jagr had seven points in the game (three goals, four assists). It was the first time that an NHL team had scored ten goals in a game since March 30, 2002, when the San Jose Sharks defeated the Columbus Blue Jackets at home by a score of 10–2. Furthermore, it was the first time that the Capitals had scored ten goals in a regular-season game since February 3, 1999, when they defeated the Tampa Bay Lightning at home by a score of 10–1.

Final standings

Playoffs

Schedule and results

Regular season

|- align="center" bgcolor="#CCFFCC"
|1||W||October 11, 2002||5–4 || align="left"|  Nashville Predators (2002–03) ||1–0–0–0 || 
|- align="center" bgcolor="#CCFFCC"
|2||W||October 12, 2002||2–1 || align="left"| @ New York Islanders (2002–03) ||2–0–0–0 || 
|- align="center" bgcolor="#CCFFCC"
|3||W||October 17, 2002||2–1 || align="left"| @ Carolina Hurricanes (2002–03) ||3–0–0–0 || 
|- align="center" bgcolor="#FFBBBB"
|4||L||October 19, 2002||1–3 || align="left"| @ Philadelphia Flyers (2002–03) ||3–1–0–0 || 
|- align="center" bgcolor="#FFBBBB"
|5||L||October 20, 2002||2–5 || align="left"| @ Dallas Stars (2002–03) ||3–2–0–0 || 
|- align="center" bgcolor="#CCFFCC"
|6||W||October 23, 2002||2–1 || align="left"| @ New York Rangers (2002–03) ||4–2–0–0 || 
|- align="center" bgcolor="#FFBBBB"
|7||L||October 25, 2002||2–3 || align="left"| @ Tampa Bay Lightning (2002–03) ||4–3–0–0 || 
|- align="center"
|8||T||October 26, 2002||1–1 OT|| align="left"| @ Florida Panthers (2002–03) ||4–3–1–0 || 
|- align="center" bgcolor="#FFBBBB"
|9||L||October 28, 2002||2–3 || align="left"| @ Pittsburgh Penguins (2002–03) ||4–4–1–0 || 
|- align="center" bgcolor="#FFBBBB"
|10||L||October 30, 2002||2–7 || align="left"|  Boston Bruins (2002–03) ||4–5–1–0 || 
|-

|- align="center" bgcolor="#CCFFCC"
|11||W||November 1, 2002||3–2 || align="left"|  Tampa Bay Lightning (2002–03) ||5–5–1–0 || 
|- align="center" bgcolor="#FFBBBB"
|12||L||November 2, 2002||1–2 || align="left"| @ Philadelphia Flyers (2002–03) ||5–6–1–0 || 
|- align="center" bgcolor="#CCFFCC"
|13||W||November 5, 2002||4–3 OT|| align="left"| @ Columbus Blue Jackets (2002–03) ||6–6–1–0 || 
|- align="center" bgcolor="#CCFFCC"
|14||W||November 7, 2002||2–1 OT|| align="left"|  Florida Panthers (2002–03) ||7–6–1–0 || 
|- align="center" bgcolor="#CCFFCC"
|15||W||November 9, 2002||4–1 || align="left"|  Philadelphia Flyers (2002–03) ||8–6–1–0 || 
|- align="center" bgcolor="#FFBBBB"
|16||L||November 13, 2002||1–6 || align="left"|  Dallas Stars (2002–03) ||8–7–1–0 || 
|- align="center"
|17||T||November 15, 2002||2–2 OT|| align="left"| @ Chicago Blackhawks (2002–03) ||8–7–2–0 || 
|- align="center" bgcolor="#FFBBBB"
|18||L||November 16, 2002||0–1 || align="left"| @ Minnesota Wild (2002–03) ||8–8–2–0 || 
|- align="center" bgcolor="#FFBBBB"
|19||L||November 19, 2002||2–3 || align="left"|  San Jose Sharks (2002–03) ||8–9–2–0 || 
|- align="center" bgcolor="#FFBBBB"
|20||L||November 21, 2002||3–4 || align="left"|  Minnesota Wild (2002–03) ||8–10–2–0 || 
|- align="center" bgcolor="#CCFFCC"
|21||W||November 23, 2002||6–3 || align="left"|  Atlanta Thrashers (2002–03) ||9–10–2–0 || 
|- align="center" bgcolor="#FFBBBB"
|22||L||November 26, 2002||4–5 || align="left"| @ Toronto Maple Leafs (2002–03) ||9–11–2–0 || 
|- align="center" bgcolor="#CCFFCC"
|23||W||November 27, 2002||4–2 || align="left"|  Calgary Flames (2002–03) ||10–11–2–0 || 
|- align="center" bgcolor="#FFBBBB"
|24||L||November 29, 2002||2–6 || align="left"|  Ottawa Senators (2002–03) ||10–12–2–0 || 
|-

|- align="center" bgcolor="#FFBBBB"
|25||L||December 1, 2002||4–5 || align="left"| @ Atlanta Thrashers (2002–03) ||10–13–2–0 || 
|- align="center" bgcolor="#CCFFCC"
|26||W||December 3, 2002||4–1 || align="left"| @ Pittsburgh Penguins (2002–03) ||11–13–2–0 || 
|- align="center" bgcolor="#CCFFCC"
|27||W||December 6, 2002||7–6 OT|| align="left"|  Atlanta Thrashers (2002–03) ||12–13–2–0 || 
|- align="center" bgcolor="#FFBBBB"
|28||L||December 7, 2002||3–4 || align="left"| @ Buffalo Sabres (2002–03) ||12–14–2–0 || 
|- align="center" bgcolor="#FFBBBB"
|29||L||December 11, 2002||0–3 || align="left"| @ Mighty Ducks of Anaheim (2002–03) ||12–15–2–0 || 
|- align="center" bgcolor="#CCFFCC"
|30||W||December 13, 2002||4–3 || align="left"| @ Phoenix Coyotes (2002–03) ||13–15–2–0 || 
|- align="center" bgcolor="#FFBBBB"
|31||L||December 14, 2002||0–2 || align="left"| @ San Jose Sharks (2002–03) ||13–16–2–0 || 
|- align="center"
|32||T||December 16, 2002||2–2 OT|| align="left"| @ Colorado Avalanche (2002–03) ||13–16–3–0 || 
|- align="center" bgcolor="#CCFFCC"
|33||W||December 19, 2002||5–3 || align="left"|  Boston Bruins (2002–03) ||14–16–3–0 || 
|- align="center" bgcolor="#CCFFCC"
|34||W||December 21, 2002||3–1 || align="left"| @ New York Islanders (2002–03) ||15–16–3–0 || 
|- align="center" bgcolor="#CCFFCC"
|35||W||December 23, 2002||3–0 || align="left"|  Tampa Bay Lightning (2002–03) ||16–16–3–0 || 
|- align="center" bgcolor="#CCFFCC"
|36||W||December 27, 2002||3–2 || align="left"|  New Jersey Devils (2002–03) ||17–16–3–0 || 
|- align="center" bgcolor="#FF6F6F"
|37||OTL||December 28, 2002||1–2 OT|| align="left"| @ New Jersey Devils (2002–03) ||17–16–3–1 || 
|- align="center" bgcolor="#CCFFCC"
|38||W||December 30, 2002||4–3 || align="left"|  Buffalo Sabres (2002–03) ||18–16–3–1 || 
|-

|- align="center" bgcolor="#FF6F6F"
|39||OTL||January 1, 2003||1–2 OT|| align="left"|  Phoenix Coyotes (2002–03) ||18–16–3–2 || 
|- align="center"
|40||T||January 3, 2003||2–2 OT|| align="left"|  Columbus Blue Jackets (2002–03) ||18–16–4–2 || 
|- align="center"
|41||T||January 4, 2003||2–2 OT|| align="left"| @ New York Rangers (2002–03) ||18–16–5–2 || 
|- align="center" bgcolor="#CCFFCC"
|42||W||January 10, 2003||4–1 || align="left"| @ Carolina Hurricanes (2002–03) ||19–16–5–2 || 
|- align="center" bgcolor="#CCFFCC"
|43||W||January 11, 2003||12–2 || align="left"|  Florida Panthers (2002–03) ||20–16–5–2 || 
|- align="center" bgcolor="#CCFFCC"
|44||W||January 13, 2003||4–3 OT|| align="left"|  New York Islanders (2002–03) ||21–16–5–2 || 
|- align="center" bgcolor="#FF6F6F"
|45||OTL||January 15, 2003||1–2 OT|| align="left"|  New York Rangers (2002–03) ||21–16–5–3 || 
|- align="center" bgcolor="#FFBBBB"
|46||L||January 17, 2003||1–4 || align="left"|  Toronto Maple Leafs (2002–03) ||21–17–5–3 || 
|- align="center" bgcolor="#FFBBBB"
|47||L||January 18, 2003||2–5 || align="left"| @ Ottawa Senators (2002–03) ||21–18–5–3 || 
|- align="center"
|48||T||January 20, 2003||3–3 OT|| align="left"| @ Boston Bruins (2002–03) ||21–18–6–3 || 
|- align="center" bgcolor="#CCFFCC"
|49||W||January 22, 2003||5–3 || align="left"|  Carolina Hurricanes (2002–03) ||22–18–6–3 || 
|- align="center"
|50||T||January 25, 2003||1–1 OT|| align="left"| @ Montreal Canadiens (2002–03) ||22–18–7–3 || 
|- align="center" bgcolor="#CCFFCC"
|51||W||January 26, 2003||7–2 || align="left"|  New York Rangers (2002–03) ||23–18–7–3 || 
|- align="center" bgcolor="#FFBBBB"
|52||L||January 28, 2003||3–5 || align="left"|  St. Louis Blues (2002–03) ||23–19–7–3 || 
|- align="center" bgcolor="#CCFFCC"
|53||W||January 30, 2003||2–1 || align="left"|  Pittsburgh Penguins (2002–03) ||24–19–7–3 || 
|-

|- align="center" bgcolor="#CCFFCC"
|54||W||February 4, 2003||5–1 || align="left"| @ Tampa Bay Lightning (2002–03) ||25–19–7–3 || 
|- align="center" bgcolor="#FFBBBB"
|55||L||February 5, 2003||1–4 || align="left"|  New Jersey Devils (2002–03) ||25–20–7–3 || 
|- align="center" bgcolor="#CCFFCC"
|56||W||February 7, 2003||3–0 || align="left"|  New York Islanders (2002–03) ||26–20–7–3 || 
|- align="center" bgcolor="#FFBBBB"
|57||L||February 9, 2003||0–2 || align="left"|  Montreal Canadiens (2002–03) ||26–21–7–3 || 
|- align="center" bgcolor="#CCFFCC"
|58||W||February 12, 2003||5–1 || align="left"| @ Atlanta Thrashers (2002–03) ||27–21–7–3 || 
|- align="center" bgcolor="#FFBBBB"
|59||L||February 14, 2003||1–3 || align="left"| @ Carolina Hurricanes (2002–03) ||27–22–7–3 || 
|- align="center" bgcolor="#CCFFCC"
|60||W||February 15, 2003||2–1 || align="left"| @ Florida Panthers (2002–03) ||28–22–7–3 || 
|- align="center" bgcolor="#FFBBBB"
|61||L||February 17, 2003||1–3 || align="left"| @ Tampa Bay Lightning (2002–03) ||28–23–7–3 || 
|- align="center" bgcolor="#FFBBBB"
|62||L||February 20, 2003||2–6 || align="left"|  Toronto Maple Leafs (2002–03) ||28–24–7–3 || 
|- align="center" bgcolor="#FFBBBB"
|63||L||February 22, 2003||1–5 || align="left"|  Detroit Red Wings (2002–03) ||28–25–7–3 || 
|- align="center" bgcolor="#CCFFCC"
|64||W||February 24, 2003||4–1 || align="left"|  Montreal Canadiens (2002–03) ||29–25–7–3 || 
|- align="center" bgcolor="#CCFFCC"
|65||W||February 26, 2003||3–2 || align="left"|  Buffalo Sabres (2002–03) ||30–25–7–3 || 
|-

|- align="center" bgcolor="#FF6F6F"
|66||OTL||March 1, 2003||1–2 OT|| align="left"| @ New Jersey Devils (2002–03) ||30–25–7–4 || 
|- align="center" bgcolor="#CCFFCC"
|67||W||March 2, 2003||2–0 || align="left"|  Carolina Hurricanes (2002–03) ||31–25–7–4 || 
|- align="center" bgcolor="#CCFFCC"
|68||W||March 4, 2003||2–1 || align="left"| @ Buffalo Sabres (2002–03) ||32–25–7–4 || 
|- align="center"
|69||T||March 6, 2003||4–4 OT|| align="left"|  Atlanta Thrashers (2002–03) ||32–25–8–4 || 
|- align="center" bgcolor="#FF6F6F"
|70||OTL||March 8, 2003||4–5 OT|| align="left"| @ Boston Bruins (2002–03) ||32–25–8–5 || 
|- align="center" bgcolor="#CCFFCC"
|71||W||March 10, 2003||2–1 OT|| align="left"|  Philadelphia Flyers (2002–03) ||33–25–8–5 || 
|- align="center" bgcolor="#FFBBBB"
|72||L||March 14, 2003||1–3 || align="left"|  Los Angeles Kings (2002–03) ||33–26–8–5 || 
|- align="center" bgcolor="#CCFFCC"
|73||W||March 16, 2003||2–1 || align="left"|  Colorado Avalanche (2002–03) ||34–26–8–5 || 
|- align="center" bgcolor="#CCFFCC"
|74||W||March 20, 2003||4–1 || align="left"| @ Calgary Flames (2002–03) ||35–26–8–5 || 
|- align="center" bgcolor="#FFBBBB"
|75||L||March 22, 2003||3–5 || align="left"| @ Edmonton Oilers (2002–03) ||35–27–8–5 || 
|- align="center" bgcolor="#FFBBBB"
|76||L||March 23, 2003||0–6 || align="left"| @ Vancouver Canucks (2002–03) ||35–28–8–5 || 
|- align="center" bgcolor="#CCFFCC"
|77||W||March 25, 2003||4–3 OT|| align="left"| @ Montreal Canadiens (2002–03) ||36–28–8–5 || 
|- align="center" bgcolor="#CCFFCC"
|78||W||March 28, 2003||3–2 || align="left"| @ Ottawa Senators (2002–03) ||37–28–8–5 || 
|- align="center" bgcolor="#FF6F6F"
|79||OTL||March 29, 2003||3–4 OT|| align="left"| @ Toronto Maple Leafs (2002–03) ||37–28–8–6 || 
|-

|- align="center" bgcolor="#CCFFCC"
|80||W||April 1, 2003||3–0 || align="left"|  Florida Panthers (2002–03) ||38–28–8–6 || 
|- align="center" bgcolor="#FFBBBB"
|81||L||April 3, 2003||1–5 || align="left"|  Ottawa Senators (2002–03) ||38–29–8–6 || 
|- align="center" bgcolor="#CCFFCC"
|82||W||April 5, 2003||5–3 || align="left"|  Pittsburgh Penguins (2002–03) ||39–29–8–6 || 
|-

|-
| Legend:

Playoffs

|- align="center" bgcolor="#CCFFCC"
| 1 ||W|| April 10, 2003 || 3–0 || @ Tampa Bay Lightning || Capitals lead 1–0 || 
|- align="center" bgcolor="#CCFFCC"
| 2 ||W|| April 12, 2003 || 6–3 || @ Tampa Bay Lightning || Capitals lead 2–0 || 
|- align="center" bgcolor="#FFBBBB"
| 3 ||L|| April 15, 2003 || 3–4 OT || Tampa Bay Lightning || Capitals lead 2–1 || 
|- align="center" bgcolor="#FFBBBB"
| 4 ||L|| April 16, 2003 || 1–3 || Tampa Bay Lightning || Series tied 2–2 || 
|- align="center" bgcolor="#FFBBBB"
| 5 ||L|| April 18, 2003 || 1–2 || @ Tampa Bay Lightning || Lightning lead 3–2 || 
|- align="center" bgcolor="#FFBBBB"
| 6 ||L|| April 20, 2003 || 1–2 3OT || Tampa Bay Lightning || Lightning win 4–2 || 
|-

|-
| Legend:

Player statistics

Scoring
 Position abbreviations: C = Center; D = Defense; G = Goaltender; LW = Left Wing; RW = Right Wing
  = Joined team via a transaction (e.g., trade, waivers, signing) during the season. Stats reflect time with the Capitals only.
  = Left team via a transaction (e.g., trade, waivers, release) during the season. Stats reflect time with the Capitals only.

Goaltending
  = Left team via a transaction (e.g., trade, waivers, release) during the season. Stats reflect time with the Capitals only.

Awards and records

Awards

Transactions
The Capitals were involved in the following transactions from June 14, 2002, the day after the deciding game of the 2002 Stanley Cup Finals, through June 9, 2003, the day of the deciding game of the 2003 Stanley Cup Finals.

Trades

Players acquired

Players lost

Signings

Draft picks
Washington's draft picks at the 2002 NHL Entry Draft held at the Air Canada Centre in Toronto, Ontario.

See also
 2002–03 NHL season

Notes

References

Wash
Wash
Washington Capitals seasons
Cap
Cap